Jimmy Farrell (6 March 1919 – 2 August 2007) was an Australian rules footballer who played with Essendon in the Victorian Football League (VFL).

Notes

External links 
		

1919 births
2007 deaths
Australian rules footballers from Victoria (Australia)
Essendon Football Club players